The Central Lancashire Cricket League (CLCL) was a fifteen team cricket league, traditionally based in Lancashire and the West Riding of Yorkshire. It was then based in Greater Manchester and West Yorkshire.  The league ran competitions at First Team, Second Team, Third Team, Under 18, Under 15, Under 13 and Under 11 levels.

The league was due to expand to a sixteen club format in 2005. Monton & Weaste were awarded the extra place ahead of Bamford Fieldhouse, Saddleworth, Elton, Walshaw, Didsbury and Bury. However, Stand left the league before the 2005 season and their replacement, Clifton did not join until 2006. That latter year also saw the introduction of a Twenty20 competition in the league, which was first won by Norden.

2015 was the final season for the league. Many of its clubs opting to join the new Greater Manchester Cricket League which started in 2016, CLCL merged with the Saddleworth League to form the Pennine League. The Pennine League failed after only two seasons, blamed by the league secretary on the expansion plans of the Lancashire League It was announced early in the 2017 season that Norden, Walsden, Littleborough, Rochdale and Middleton would all move to the Lancashire League.

Member clubs

Honours

* The title was shared in these years.

See also
Club cricket
List of English cricket clubs

References

External links
 Official website

English domestic cricket competitions
Cricket in Greater Manchester